State Road 469 (NM 469) is a  state highway in the US state of New Mexico. NM 469's southern terminus is at NM 209 in Grady, and the northern terminus is at U.S. Route 54 (US 54) in Logan.

Major intersections

See also

References

469
Transportation in Curry County, New Mexico
Transportation in Quay County, New Mexico